The Dalian International Marathon is an annual marathon held in Dalian, China. It is recognized by IRRA and China Athletic Association of Road Running Committee. It was first held in 1987, making it one of the oldest races in China.

In 2015 30,000 runners took part, with 25 elite runners. The prize for the winner was $30,000, with the runner up receiving $20,000.

The 2020 edition of the race was postponed due to the COVID-19 pandemic.

Winners 

Key:

References

 Dalian Marathon. Association of Road Racing Statisticians (2011-05-07). Retrieved on 2011-10-07.

External links 
 

Marathons in China
Sport in Dalian
Recurring sporting events established in 1987
Spring (season) events in China